Thomas B. Smith (November 2, 1869 – April 17, 1949) was an American politician from Pennsylvania. A member of the Republican Party, he served as a member of the Pennsylvania House of Representatives and was the 82nd Mayor of Philadelphia from 1916 until 1920.

Biography
Smith was born November 2, 1868 in Philadelphia. Prior to this political career, he worked for the Pennsylvania Railroad, The Philadelphia Record and the National Surety Co. of New York. He entered politics as the Republican Party’s chairman for the 28th Ward and won election to the Common Council, which was the lower house of the Philadelphia City Council. In 1905, he won a seat in the Pennsylvania House of Representatives, where he served one term. Later he secured appointments as postmaster for the city of Philadelphia and the Public Service Commissioner.

Mayor of Philadelphia
In 1915, he ran for mayor and defeated George Porter in the general election.

During the 1917 primary election, Smith, who was allied with William Scott Vare’s political machine, supported Issac Deutsch in for the Republican nomination. Jim McNichol, who was part of the Boies Penrose machine, supported James Carey. Deutsch’s supporters brought a gang from New York who attacked Carey. During the melee, a police officer, George Eppley, was shot and killed.  Much of the blame fell on Smith, who, as mayor, controlled the police, worked to ensure that the officers assigned to the district would support Vare’s candidate and harass supporters of Carey.

The District Attorney, Samuel Rotan, who was a Penrose ally, indicted Mayor Smith for ‘conspiracy to commit murder’ as well as impeding a free and fair election. While he was acquitted of the charges, the cloud of suspicion hung over the mayor for the remainder of his term.

Smith died April 17, 1949 in Abington Township, Montgomery County, Pennsylvania.

References

1869 births
1949 deaths
Republican Party members of the Pennsylvania House of Representatives
Mayors of Philadelphia